The Beaulieu 5008 S is a Super 8 mm film dual-speed professional camera. This camera was released by the Beaulieu (company). It was first launched in February 1974. The primary component that set this camera apart from other Super 8mm cameras of the era was that it was made with a unique SLR function and interchangeable Schneider Kreuznach and Angenieux zoom lens.

Features 

Format: Super-8 Kodapak, Kodachrome or Ektachrome (see external link)
 Lens: changeable, Schneider Kreuznach Optivaron zoom 6–66 mm   or Angenieux 6–80 mm 
 Macro with Schneider Kreuznach:  from 0 to 1500 mm (just under 5 ft)
 Filter: built-in Wratten filter 85
 Aperture: motor driven with reflexmatic motor or manual
 Zooming: Electric speed from 4 to 12 seconds or manual
 Viewer: Reflex with tilting matte screen
 Shutter: with guillotine 1/40 sec (18 fps) or 1/60 sec (24 fps)
 Exposure metering: CdS cell
 ASA: 25 to 400
 Remote control: electrical
 Power supply: rechargeable 500mA/ 7.2 V NiCd batt.
 Sound: built-in amplifier 50 to 12 kHz +/- 1.5 dB (24 images) and 50 to 9.5 kHz +/- 1.5 dB (18 images)
 Signal/noise: 57 dB
 Earphone Z > 1.5 KΩ
 Mike: DIN 5 pins, with 3 sensibilities: 0.15mV to 20mV Z = 5KΩ, 3mV to 15mV  Z = 100KΩ and 30mV to 1.2V  Z = 500KΩ
 Capstan instability: 0.4%
 Dimensions: 34 cm (l) x 10 cm (w) x 21 cm (h)
 Weight: 2.55 kg with Angenieux zoom 6-80

See also 
Super 8 mm film
Super 8 film cameras

References

External links
Beaulieu France

Movie cameras
Products introduced in 1974